George Alexander Cruickshank (1 February 1853 – 12 April 1904) was an Australian politician. Born near Dubbo, New South Wales, he attended Collegiate School in Bathurst, and was a grazier in northern New South Wales from 1878. In 1889 he was elected to the New South Wales Legislative Assembly as the member for Inverell, a position he held until 1898. In the first federal election in 1901, Cruickshank was elected to the Australian House of Representatives as a Protectionist, representing the seat of Gwydir. He retired in 1903, and died in 1904.

References

Protectionist Party members of the Parliament of Australia
Members of the Australian House of Representatives for Gwydir
Members of the Australian House of Representatives
Members of the New South Wales Legislative Assembly
1853 births
1904 deaths
19th-century Australian politicians
20th-century Australian politicians